Valashabad (also spelled as Valakhshkert, Valakhshgerd and Valakhshkard), known in Greek sources as Vologesocerta, and in Arabic sources as Sabat, was an ancient city in present-day Iraq, and formed a suburb of Ctesiphon, the capital of the Parthian Empire and their successors, the Sasanian Empire.

The city was founded by the Parthian king Vologases I (r. 51-78) and was captured in 226 by the Sasanians. In 636, the city was attacked by Muslim Arabs under the Arab general Khalid ibn Urfuta. At Valashabad stood a force of troops, which the former Sasanian monarch Borandukht saw as an important part of the survival of the Sasanian Empire, were annihilated by the Arabs, who were joined by the former Sasanian general Shirzadh, who aided them in capturing Veh-Ardashir, another suburb of Ctesiphon.

Sources

 
 

 
 
 

Parthian cities
Sasanian cities
Former populated places in Iraq
Quarters and suburbs of Ctesiphon